Gorytes quinquecinctus is a species of sand wasps belonging to the family Crabronidae.

Subspecies
Gorytes quinquecinctus quinquecinctus (Fabricius, 1793) 
Gorytes quinquecinctus sinuatus (A. Costa, 1869)

Description
These small wasps are black with yellow markings. Mandibles are black, while clypeus is black with yellow spots.

They nest in the soil. The preys are commonly represented by small leafhoppers (Auchenorrhyncha).

Distribution and habitat
This species is present in Europe, Russia, Ukraine, Turkey, Azerbaijan, Kyrgyzstan, Uzbekistan, Kazakhstan, Korea, Mongolia, Algeria, Morocco and Tunisia. These wasps can be found in dry grasslands.

References

 Bohart, R. M. & Menke, A. S. Sphecid Wasps of the World: a Generic Revision. — Berkeley: Univ. California Press, 1976

Crabronidae
Hymenoptera of Africa
Hymenoptera of Asia
Hymenoptera of Europe
Taxa named by Johan Christian Fabricius
Insects described in 1793